Lee Ki-bok (born 18 July 1995) is a South Korean curler. He competed in the 2018 Winter Olympics as the lead on the South Korean men's team skipped by Kim Chang-min.

Personal life
Lee's brother Ki-jeong is also a curler.

References

External links

1995 births
Living people
Curlers at the 2018 Winter Olympics
South Korean male curlers
Olympic curlers of South Korea
Pacific-Asian curling champions
21st-century South Korean people
Competitors at the 2017 Winter Universiade